The Teichfuss Nibio (the German-speaking Teichfuss's spelling of the Italian Nibbio or ) was an Italian single seat glider, designed by Luigi Teichfuss and flown in two versions around 1930.

Design and development

The original Nibio, the Nibio I was designed as a primary glider and was built in the Royal Aircraft factory at Pavullo nel Frignano Airport during 1929. Some launches were made by aerotow, behind an Aviatik from Taliedo. The Nibio II, sometimes known as the Nibio II Freccia Nera followed the next year with a new wing. Despite its longer wing the Nibio II was  lighter.

The Nibio II was a high-wing monoplane with its wing braced by a single faired strut on each side, joining the lower fuselage to  the outer end of the central panel at about one third span. This central panel was rectangular in plan and was without dihedral. The outer panels were straight tapered to blunt tips, the wing becoming thinner and thus acquiring dihedral though retaining a horizontal upper surface. Ailerons occupied the whole trailing edges of these outer panels; there were no inboard flaps or air brakes.

Its wood framed, plywood skinned fuselage was hexagonal in cross section, tapering markedly on its underside towards the tail. The wing was mounted on a pedestal which sloped away aft into the upper fuselage. The pilot's cockpit, open behind a small windscreen, was immediately ahead of the pedestal and below the wing leading edge. The tail surfaces were straight tapered and straight tipped, with the tailplane mounted on the fuselage.  The rudder extended down to the keel, operating within a small cut-out between the elevators and protected from the ground by a small underfin which served as a tail bumper. There was a short landing skid running from near the nose to just aft of the wing strut.

Variants
Nibio I Training glider, flown 1929. One only.
Nibio II Freccia Nera (also written as Nibio 2 ),(Freccia Nera - Black Arrow), Higher performance version with greater span and aspect ratio, flown 1930. One only.

Specifications (Nibio II Freccia Nera)

See also

References

Nibio
1920s Italian sailplanes
Aircraft first flown in 1926
High-wing aircraft